Adhikar may refer to:

Films
 Adhikar (1939 film), starring P.C. Barua
 Adhikar (1954 film), starring Usha Kiran
 Adhikar (1971 film), a Hindi film starring Ashok Kumar
 Adhikar (1971 Marathi film), starring Shammi
 Adhikar (1986 film), starring Rajesh Khanna
 Adhikar (1990 film), a Nepali film starring Rajesh Hamal
 Adhikar (1992 film), starring Prosenjit
 Adhikar (TV series), directed by Jahnu Barua

Organizations
 Odhikar, a Bangladesh human rights organization